Noor Wodjouatt is an Afghan-American musician and television producer.

He was educated in France and founded the Noor Wodjouatt Ensemble in 2004. The group has performed at the Kennedy Center,  Richmond Forum, and Seton Hall University. He has collaborated with Broto Roy  and performed at Syracuse University.

In 2011, he wrote a book on classical Indian music.

In 2012, Wodjouatt founded Zarin TV which broadcasts entertainment and educational programs for the Afghan and Iranian populations.

References

American people of Afghan descent
American musicians of Afghan descent
American television producers
Living people
Year of birth missing (living people)